The 1998 Ohio gubernatorial election was held on November 3, 1998. Incumbent Republican Governor of Ohio George Voinovich could not seek a third term as Governor due to term limits, and ran for the United States Senate instead. To replace him, former Attorney General of Ohio Lee Fisher and Ohio Secretary of State Bob Taft won the Democratic and Republican primaries, respectively. Taft and Fisher faced off in a highly competitive general election, and in the end, Taft (a great-grandson of U.S. President and Supreme Court Chief Justice William Howard Taft) beat out Fisher by a narrow margin, making this gubernatorial election one of Ohio's closest.

Democratic primary

Candidates
Lee Fisher, former Attorney General of Ohio, former member of the Ohio Senate, former member of the Ohio House of Representatives

Results

Republican primary

Candidates
Bob Taft, Ohio Secretary of State, former member of the Ohio House of Representatives, great-grandson of President William Howard Taft

Results

General election

Results

References

Gubernatorial
1998
Ohio